Great Britain competed at the 2018 Winter Olympics in Pyeongchang, South Korea, from 9 to 25 February 2018, with 58 competitors in 11 sports. They won five medals in total, one gold and four bronze, ranking 19th in the medal table.

Medallists

There were a number of notable firsts for Great Britain at the Winter Olympics:
Day 8 (17 February) was the most successful day for Great Britain at any Winter Olympics, with three medals won.
Lizzy Yarnold was the first British athlete to retain a Winter Olympic title and, in doing so, became Great Britain's most successful Winter Olympic athlete by surpassing the single gold and bronze medals won by Jeannette Altwegg, Christopher Dean and Jayne Torvill.
Yarnold and Laura Deas were the first British athletes to win medals in the same event at the same Winter games.
Izzy Atkin won Great Britain's first-ever medal on skis.
On Day 15 (24 February) Great Britain won a fifth medal at a single Winter Olympics for the first time.

Records

Competitors
The following is the list of number of competitors participating at the Games per sport/discipline.

Medal and performance targets
On 9 January 2018, the funding body UK Sport announced their medal targets for Team GB at the 2018 Winter Olympic Games in Pyeongchang with the target to win at least five medals which if achieved would be a record-breaking haul for a Winter Olympic Games. Although the target was set at three medals the funding body predicted that Great Britain had the potential to win as many as ten medals, this total was not widely expected to be reached.

UK Sport funding
In the Winter Olympic Cycle running from 2014 to 2018 the UK government body UK Sport allocated a record budget of over £28 million to fund Team GB for the individual athletes as well as the bobsleigh and curling teams for the 2018 Winter Olympics in Pyeongchang. The sports receiving the highest funding were bobsleigh, curling and skeleton, whilst speed skating, ski and snowboard, and figure skating also received funding, but all other winter sports where British athletes were competing did not receive any funding from the body.

Alpine skiing

Mixed

 * = decided on tie-break (combined time)

Biathlon 

On 22 January 2018, the British Olympic Association announced Amanda Lightfoot as the selection for their solitary representative in the Biathlon competitions. Lightfoot finished 67th in the sprint event, failing to qualify for the pursuit in which only the top 60 sprint athletes took part.

Bobsleigh 

Based on their rankings in the 2017-18 World Cup, Great Britain qualified 4 sleds.

* – Denotes the driver of each sled 
Sam Blanchet and Montell Douglas were travelling reserves

Cross-country skiing 
Andrew Musgrave's seventh place in the men's 30 km skiathlon was the best performance by a Briton in an Olympic cross country event.
Distance

Sprint

Curling 

Great Britain qualified a men's and women's team for a total of 10 athletes (five of each gender). The teams were officially announced on 22 June 2017. Outside of the Olympic Games, Great Britain competes under the flags of its constituent home nations, Scotland, England and Wales (Northern Irish players compete for a combined Ireland); Scotland results are treated as Great Britain for the purposes of Olympic qualification.
Summary

Men's tournament

Based on results from the 2016 and 2017 World Championships obtained by Scotland, Great Britain qualified a men's team, consisting of five athletes, as one of the seven highest ranked nations.

Team

Round-robin
Great Britain had a bye in draws 4, 7 and 11

Draw 1
Wednesday 14 February, 09:05

Draw 2
Wednesday 14 February, 20:05

Draw 3
Thursday 15 February, 14:05

Draw 5
Friday 16 February, 20:05

Draw 6
Saturday 17 February, 14:05

Draw 8
Sunday 18 February, 20:05

Draw 9
Monday 19 February, 14:05

Draw 10
Tuesday 20 February, 09:05

Draw 12
Wednesday 21 February, 14:05

Tiebreaker

Having finished tied for fourth with the same record in the round robin stage the Great Britain men's team faced a tiebreaker against Switzerland for a place in the semifinals.

Thursday February 22, 9:05

Women's tournament

Based on results from the 2016 and 2017 World Women's Curling Championships, Great Britain qualified a women's team, consisting of five athletes, as one of the seven highest ranked nations.
Team

Round-robin
Great Britain had a bye in draws 4, 8 and 12

Draw 1
Wednesday 14 February, 14:05

Draw 2
Thursday 15 February, 09:05

Draw 3
Thursday 15 February, 20:05

Draw 5
Saturday 17 February, 09:05

Draw 6
Saturday 17 February, 20:05

Draw 7
Sunday 18 February, 14:05

Draw 9
Monday 19 February, 20:05

Draw 10
Tuesday 20 February, 14:05

Draw 11
Wednesday 21 February, 09:05

Semifinal
Friday 23 February, 20:05

Bronze Medal Game
Saturday 24 February, 20:05

Figure skating

Freestyle skiing 

Aerials

Halfpipe

Ski cross

Qualification legend: FA – Qualify to medal round; FB – Qualify to consolation round

Slopestyle

Luge

On 18 January 2018, the British Olympic Association announced the selection of the athletes who will compete for Team GB in the luge in Pyeongchang. American-born Adam Rosen competed in the luge for Great Britain in his third Olympics.

Short track speed skating 

Great Britain qualified five short track speed skaters (two male and three female) based on results at the 2017–18 ISU Short Track Speed Skating World Cup.

Qualification Legend: FA = Qualify to final (medal); Q = Qualify to next round; OR = Olympic record

Skeleton 

Based on the world rankings, Great Britain qualified 4 sleds.

Snowboarding 

Freestyle

Snowboard cross

Notes

References

2018
Nations at the 2018 Winter Olympics
Winter Olympics